General Egerton may refer to:

Caledon Egerton (1814–1874), British Army major general
Charles Egerton (Indian Army officer) (1848–1921), British Indian Army general
Sir Charles Bulkeley Egerton (1774–1857), British Army general
David Egerton (British Army officer) (1914–2010), British Army major general
John Egerton, 7th Earl of Bridgewater (1753–1823), British Army general